Hartford is a suburban American city in Minnehaha County, South Dakota, a few miles northwest of Sioux Falls. Its population was 3,354 at the 2020 census.

History
Hartford was named in 1880 after Hartford, Connecticut. An early variant name was Oaksville. A post office has operated here since 1880. The city incorporated in 1896.

Geography
Its ZIP code is 57033.

Demographics

2010 census
At the 2010 census there were 2,534 people, 913 households, and 684 families living in the city. The racial makeup of the city was 96.5% White, 0.6% African American, 1.2% Native American, 0.2% Asian, 0.1% from other races, and 1.4% from two or more races. Hispanic or Latino of any race were 0.6%.

Of the 913 households 45.3% had children under the age of 18 living with them, 62.2% were married couples living together, 9.4% had a female householder with no husband present, 3.3% had a male householder with no wife present, and 25.1% were non-families. 20.0% of households were one person and 7.8% were one person aged 65 or older. The average household size was 2.78 and the average family size was 3.23.

The median age was 31.9 years. 32.7% of residents were under the age of 18; 6.2% were between the ages of 18 and 24; 30.3% were from 25 to 44; 22.7% were from 45 to 64; and 8.3% were 65 or older. The gender makeup of the city was 48.2% male and 51.8% female.

2000 census
At the 2000 census, there were 1,844 people, 661 households, and 534 families living in the city. The population density was 1,236.6 people per square mile (477.8/km2). There were 675 housing units at an average density of 452.7 per square mile (174.9/km2). The racial makeup of the city was 97.56% White, 0.11% African American, 1.14% Native American, 0.05% Asian, 0.22% from other races, and 0.92% from two or more races. Hispanic or Latino of any race were 0.33% of the population.

Of the 661 households 48.6% had children under the age of 18 living with them, 66.0% were married couples living together, 12.4% had a female householder with no husband present, and 19.1% were non-families. 15.9% of households were one person and 6.1% were one person aged 65 or older. The average household size was 2.77 and the average family size was 3.09.

The age distribution was 32.0% under the age of 18, 6.5% from 18 to 24, 34.7% from 25 to 44, 18.4% from 45 to 64, and 8.5% 65 or older. The median age was 32 years. For every 100 females, there were 95.3 males. For every 100 females age 18 and over, there were 92.3 males.

The median household income was $48,333, and the median family income was $53,942. Males had a median income of $34,792 versus $25,032 for females. The per capita income for the city was $20,726. About 2.8% of families and 3.8% of the population were below the poverty line, including 5.6% of those under age 18 and 7.5% of those age 65 or over.

Notable people

 Ruth Brinker, activist and founder of the nonprofit, Project Open Hand.
 Michael John Fitzmaurice, former United States Army soldier and recipient of the Medal of Honor for his actions in the Vietnam War
 Rhonda Milstead, member of the South Dakota House of Representatives

See also
 List of cities in South Dakota

References

External links

Cities in South Dakota
Cities in Minnehaha County, South Dakota
Sioux Falls, South Dakota metropolitan area